Samantha Fox is the second studio album by English singer Samantha Fox. It was released in July 1987 by Jive Records. The album charted at number 22 in the United Kingdom, number 51 in the United States, number 41 in Canada, number 86 in Australia and number 16 in Germany.

After her debut album went gold, Fox returned to the studio to record her eponymous second album. Emerging British super producers Stock Aitken Waterman were enlisted to contribute one track, "Nothing's Gonna Stop Me Now", after her label reportedly became concerned the album did not contain any obvious hits. However, US producers Full Force, who were helping Lisa Lisa at that time, also delivered a top 5 US hit for the album with "Naughty Girls (Need Love Too)". The album also spawned the singles "I Surrender (To the Spirit of the Night)", "I Promise You (Get Ready)", and "True Devotion".

Track listing

European, Australian and Japanese edition

US and Canadian edition

Notes
  signifies a remixer
  signifies a main producer and remixer

Charts

Weekly charts

Year-end charts

Certifications

Notes

References

1987 albums
Albums produced by Full Force
Albums produced by Stock Aitken Waterman
Jive Records albums
Samantha Fox albums